See Visual arts of the United States for the history of visual arts in the United States.

American Art is the debut album of the band Weatherbox. It was released on May 8, 2007, on Doghouse Records. The album received critical acclaim from several sources including underground music distribution company Smartpunk, who lauded the band's style: 

The Alternative Press magazine, which gave the album  stars, raved that the record would, "...change your life, if you let it."

Track listing 
 Atoms Smash
 Armed to the Teeth
 The Clearing
 Wolftank, Doff Thy Name
 Untitled
 Moments Before the Smashing of Future Ryan
 Snakes, Our Ground
 A Flock of Weatherboxes
 I Worship Raw Beats
 The Dreams
 The Drugs
 Drop the Mike
 Trippin' the Life Fantastic

References 

2007 debut albums
Doghouse Records albums